Felipe López Garrido (born 10 March 1977 in Seville) is an athlete from Spain, who competes in archery. López competed at the 2004 Summer Olympics in men's individual archery.  He was defeated in the first round of elimination, placing 40th overall.

References

1977 births
Living people
Spanish male archers
Archers at the 2004 Summer Olympics
Olympic archers of Spain
Sportspeople from Seville
21st-century Spanish people